Bertolomeu Verdial Valadares (born August 24, 1992) is an East Timorese football player. He is the current striker for the Timor-Leste national football team. He debuted against Nepal in the 2014 FIFA World Cup qualifying round, when he substituted for Anggisu Barbosa at 46 minutes.

References

External links
 

1989 births
Living people
East Timorese footballers
Association football forwards
Timor-Leste international footballers